Bavigne is a village in the commune of Lac de la Haute-Sûre, in north-western Luxembourg.  , the village had a population of 125.  It is the administrative centre of the commune of Lac de la Haute-Sûre.

Lac de la Haute-Sûre
Villages in Luxembourg